Curt Stalder (born November 20, 1957) is an American former professional tennis player.

A California native, Stalder played collegiate tennis for the UC Irvine Anteaters and won an NCAA Division II doubles championship in 1977. On the professional tour he had a best singles world ranking of 235 and was a main draw qualifier for the 1979 Jack Kramer Open in Los Angeles, losing in the second round to Víctor Pecci.

Stalder's wife, Diane Desfor, was a tennis player and their son, Reese Stalder, competes on the professional circuit.

References

External links
 
 

1957 births
Living people
American male tennis players
UC Irvine Anteaters men's tennis players
Tennis people from California